Xiaozhuang Mishi, also known as Xiaozhuang Epic, is a 2003 Chinese television series produced by You Xiaogang. The series is the first installment in a series of four television series about the early Qing dynasty. It was followed by Huang Taizi Mishi (2004), Taizu Mishi (2005) and Secret History of Kangxi (2006), all of which were also produced by You Xiaogang.

Plot
Dayu'er is a Khorchin Mongol princess who is deeply in love with Dorgon- one of the several sons of Nurhaci, a Jurchen chieftain. Yet, she soon becomes the concubine of Dorgon's older brother Hong Taiji. Hong Taiji is already married to Dayu'er's aunt Jerjer to secure the alliance between the Khorchin Mongols and Later Jin. Hong Taiji initially has feelings for Dayu'er, but realizes that she only loves Dorgon, so he directs his affections to her sister, Harjol.

Hong Taiji later becomes the founder of the Qing Dynasty, with the help of Dorgon and other brother Dodo. Dorgon and Hong Taiji have a strained relationship because of Dayu'er and the forced suicide of Dorgon's mother, Lady Abahai. After Hong Taiji's death, Dayu'er son Fulin becomes Emperor and is assisted by Dorgon. Fulin suspects that his mother and Dorgon have a love affair and strips Dorgon of his power. However, Fulin is disillusioned with life after his true love Consort Donggo dies. Dayu'er now becomes regent for her young grandson, who ascends to the throne as Kangxi Emperor.

Cast

Main
 Ning Jing as Empress Dowager Xiaozhuang (Dayu'er)
A Khorchin Mongol princess who later becomes Grand Empress Dowager of the Qing Dynasty. 
 Steve Ma as Dorgon
A brave general who helped establish the Qing Dynasty and the lover of Dayu'er.
 Liu Dekai as Hong Taiji
The ambitious founder of the Qing Dynasty and Dayu'er husband.
 Wu Qianqian as Empress Xiaoduanwen
Dayu'er's aunt and later the Empress of Hong Taiji. 
 Zhao Hongfei as Dodo
One of Nurhaci's several sons. Dorgon's younger brother, general, and close friend.  
 Hu Jing as Sumalagu
Dayu'er's attendant and later confidante. She is romantically entangled with Dorgon. 
 He Saifei as Harjol
Dayu'er's sister and Hong Taiji's lover, and suffers the death of her young son.

Supporting
 Siqin Gaowa as Lady Abahai
Dorgon and Dodo's mother who is forced into suicide. 
 Xu Huanshan as Nurhaci
Hong Taiji, Dorgon, and Dodo's father and the ruler of the Jurchens. 
 Xu Min as Daišan　　  
Nurhaci's second son and rivals for the succession.
 Li Lingyu as Noble Consort Yijing
The wife of a chieftain and later Hong Taiji's consort. 
 Bai Qinglin as Xiaoyu'er
Dorgon's official wife and jealous of his feelings towards Dayu'er. 
 Yan Kun as Fulin, the Shunzhi Emperor
 Chen Weichen as Fulin (teenager)
 Wang Peiwen as Fulin (older child)
 Li Yifan as Fulin (younger child)
Hong Taiji and Dayu'er son, and later becomes Emperor. 
 Shu Chang as Consort Donggo
Yang Zi as Consort Donggo (young)
The favorite consort of Fulin, but suffers the death of her young son. 
 Lu Jun as Hooge
The eldest son of Hong Taiji. 
 Mi Tiezeng as Fan Wencheng
Hong Taiji's trusted advisor. 
 Shen Baoping as Amin
 Guo Minghan as Manggūltai
 Wu Zitong as Namuzhong
 Guo Yufeng as Namuzhong (young)
Dayu'er's niece and later Empress, who attempts to murder Consort Donggo. 
 Wang Ge as Mengguqing
 Li Yuan as Mengguqing (young)
Dayu'er's relative and the second Empress of Fulin. 
 Gao Haiyan as Huige
 Zhu Kun as Xiaotang
 Doudou as Xiaotang (young)
 Wang Hui as Heluohui
 Fu Junfeng as Bombogor
 Han Yuqiao as Bombogor (teenager)
 Guo Zihao as Bombogor (child)
 Sun Bin as Hong Chengchou
 Zhang Yongjing as Johann Adam Schall von Bell
 Wan Yan as Zhenge
Jerjer's attendant who gains the trust of Hong Taiji. 
 Zhang Lili as Xiaonizi
 Wang Hong as Manggusi
 Tu Wenxue as Jirgalang
 Ji Yongqing as Wukeshan
 Sun Qiang as Zhu Youjian, the Chongzhen Emperor
 Wang Gang as Yuan Chonghuan
 Li Lan as Nanny Li
 Di Jianqing as Eshuo
 Hu Yao as Lingzi
 Li Jing as Chunyu
 Wu Pengda as Xuanye, the Kangxi Emperor
 Bao Dexin as Prince Jian

Reception 
Xiaozhuang Mishi first aired on HNETV on 31 December 2002. It reached first place in audience measurement in some provinces of China.

References

External links
  Xiaozhuang Mishi on Sina.com
 

2003 Chinese television series debuts
Television series set in the Qing dynasty
Mandarin-language television shows
Chinese historical television series